The Headon Formation is a geological formation found in Hampshire, England. It preserves fossils dating back to the Bartonian stage (Eocene).

See also

 List of fossiliferous stratigraphic units in England

References

 

Geologic formations of England
Paleogene England
Eocene Series of Europe
Bartonian Stage
Geology of the Isle of Wight